The Durrës-Vlorë railway is a now-mostly-disused railway line connecting the cities of Durrës and Vlorë in western Albania. Vlorë station is the southernmost point on the Albanian rail system.

History
Before the inauguration of the national network in the 1940s, two separate systems existed south of Durrës on routes later absorbed by the present railway: a 19-mile Decauville track which carried Bitumen traffic between a mine at Selence and the port of Skele near Vlorë, and a 2-mile track between Shkozet and Lekaj.

The present railway was built in stages. Rrogozhinë was the southernmost station in Albania until 1968 when an extension to Fier was completed. A further extension to Ballsh opened in 1975. Vlorë was reached by another extension in 1985.

A limited service was still in operation on the line until 2015, but passenger services no longer run south of Fier.

A private railway company, Albrail, was granted a concession to the railway section between Fier and Vlorë in February 2016 and started transport 
of crude oil from Fier to Vlorë in December 2018.

Stations

References

Railway lines in Albania
Railway lines opened in 1985